Chinook helicopter crash may refer to:

the 1986 British International Helicopters Chinook crash in Shetland, killing oil workers
the 1994 Scotland RAF Chinook crash, killing British intelligence officers
the 2011 Chinook shootdown in Afghanistan, killing American special forces